Acaprazine (INN) is an anxiolytic and "adrenolytic" drug of the phenylpiperazine group that was never marketed.

See also
 Enciprazine
 Enpiprazole
 Lorpiprazole
 Mepiprazole
 Tolpiprazole

References

External links

Acetamides
Anilines
Anxiolytics
meta-Chlorophenylpiperazines
Abandoned drugs
Sedatives